Ban Yang is a subdistrict in the Wat Bot District of Phitsanulok Province, Thailand.

Geography
Ban Yang lies in the Nan Basin, which is part of the Chao Phraya Watershed.

Administration
The subdistrict is divided into 11 smaller divisions called (muban), which roughly correspond to villages.  There are 11 villages, each of which occupies one muban. Ban Yang is administered by a Tambon administrative organization (TAO). The muban in Ban Yang are enumerated as follows:

Khwae Noi National Reserved Forest

The Khwae Noi National Reserved Forest, recently made part of Kaeng Chet Khwae National Park, covers a significant portion of the land in Ban Yang.

Temples
The following is a list of active Buddhist temples in Ban Yang:
วัดนาขาม in Ban Nakam
วัดป่าคาย in Ban Pa Khai
วัดน้ำหักพัฒนา in Ban Nam Hak
วัดน้ำคบ in Ban Nam Khob
วัดท่าสะเดาศรัทธาธรรม in Ban Tha Sador
วัดท่าแก่ง in Ban Tha Kaeng

Ban Nam Khob
The village of Ban Nam Khob is primarily flat land, with one side of the village having hills which range in elevation from 60 to 120 m.  The village economy is driven by field crops and rice paddy farming.  Women of the village engage in the preparation and processing of food, both at home and with local housewives groups.  Women have access to training and support from home economists in the Department of Agricultural Extension. Appliances such as rice cookers, gas stoves and electric irons are available in many of the homes in the village.

References

Tambon of Phitsanulok province
Populated places in Phitsanulok province